Mountain rose may refer to the plants:

 Brownea coccinea
 Kerria japonica
 Metrosideros nervulosa
 Metrosideros sclerocarpa